Aksel Nielsen (January 11, 1901 – October 18, 1984) was a Danish-American philanthropist, founder of the Mortgage Banking Association’s School of Mortgage Banking, a member of the Civil and Defense Mobilization Board and close friend and financial adviser to President Dwight D. Eisenhower. 

He was born in Mariager, Denmark and immigrated to the United States in 1910, becoming a naturalized citizen in 1922. He worked in the banking and real estate industries and served as mortgage solicitor in 1925 for the Title Guaranty Company of Denver, Colorado. He eventually became executive vice president, president and chairman of the board for this company.

In the 1920s, Nielsen married Helen Maurer and in 1927 the two had a daughter named Virginia Nielsen.

In September 1953 President Eisenhower appointed him to the Advisory Commission on Government Housing Policies and Programs. During this same period of time Nielsen also was president and then chairman of the board of the Mortgage Investments Company. In 1958 he became a member of the Civil and Defense Mobilization Board whose responsibility it was to advise the Director of the Office of Civil and Defense Mobilization.

He died of cancer in Denver in 1984.

References

External links
 Research: Finding Aids: N at the Dwight D. Eisenhower Presidential Library
  – "Eisenhower family friend" 

1901 births
1984 deaths
American bankers
American philanthropists
Dwight D. Eisenhower
Danish emigrants to the United States
People from Mariager
Deaths from cancer in Colorado